The 2020–21 Yoast United season was the first season in the existence of the club. The club plays in the Dutch Basketball League (DBL) and DBL Cup. Led by head coach Matthew Otten, the team immediately reached the Final of the 2021 DBL Cup, in which the team lost to BAL Weert. In the playoffs, Yoast was eliminated in the quarterfinals by Heroes Den Bosch.

Austin Luke was one of United's important players, he led the DBL in assists. Bob Berghuis was named to the DBL All-Rookie Team.

Roster

Transactions

In 

|}

References

External links
 Official website

2020–21 in Dutch basketball by club
2020–21 Dutch Basketball League by club